Tŏkhyŏn station is a railway station in Tŏkhyŏn Workers' District, Ŭiju County, North P'yŏngan Province, North Korea, on the Tŏkhyŏn Line of the Korean State Railway.

History
The station, along with the rest of the Tŏkhyŏn Line, was opened by the Korean State Railway in April 1971.

Services
The station is served by commuter trains between here and Sinŭiju.

References

Railway stations in North Korea
Buildings and structures in North Pyongan Province
Railway stations opened in 1971
1971 establishments in North Korea